is a Quasi-National Park in Fukui and Kyōto Prefectures, Japan. Established in 1955, the central feature of the park is the ria coast of Wakasa Bay.

Sites of interest
 Kanmurijima, Mikata Five Lakes,

Related municipalities
 Fukui: Mihama, Obama, Ōi, Takahama, Tsuruga, Wakasa
 Kyōto: Maizuru

See also

 National Parks of Japan
 Ramsar Sites in Japan

References

National parks of Japan
Parks and gardens in Fukui Prefecture
Parks and gardens in Kyoto Prefecture
Protected areas established in 1955
1955 establishments in Japan